MIKBUG is a ROM monitor from Motorola for the Motorola 6800 8-bit microprocessor. It is intended to "be used to debug and evaluate a user's program".

MIKBUG was distributed by Motorola in 1974 on a 1 K ROM chip part number MCM6830L7. It occupied 512 bytes on the chip, where the remainder was occupied by a 256 byte MINIBUG monitor—a stripped-down version of MIKBUG—and a 256 byte "test pattern" (really just a different and unused revision of MINIBUG). It requires 128 bytes of random-access memory for operation. Its functionality was similar to other monitors of the early microcomputer era, such as the Intel MON-80 for the Intel 8080.

MIKBUG is initiated when power is first applied to the system, or when the system RESET button is pressed. It assumes the presence of a terminal that the user will use to issue commands.

List of commands and functions 

Callable functions include input and output of a character on the terminal, input and output of a byte in hexadecimal format, print a string terminated by EOT, and terminate the current program and return control to MIKBUG.

MIKBUG allows the user to install an interrupt handler using the M command to specify the handler address.

Listings of MIKBUG and MINIBUG monitors are available online.

References

Motorola microprocessors
Microcomputer software